Kuzhimattom is a small village in the Kottayam district of the Kerala state, India. It is about 11 km from Kottayam. It is situated in the Panachikkad panchayat and belongs to the block of Pallom.

Kuzhimattom is filled with lushy green vegetation, beautiful paddy fields, brooks and streams. The Kuzhimattom Thodu (a stream) is famous in the locality.

One of the major landmarks of Kuzhimattom is the St. George Orthodox church, which was established in 1902. Panchikkadu (also known as Dakshina Mookambika), located in Kuzhimattom village, is dedicated to goddess Saraswati, and is very famous for its Vidyarambham .

The Kuzhimattom Post Office and Village office are located at Paruthumpara.

See also 
 Temples of Kerala

References

Villages in Kottayam district